Elachistocleis surinamensis is a species of frog in the family Microhylidae.
It is found in Suriname, Trinidad and Tobago, Venezuela, and possibly Guyana.
Its natural habitats are subtropical or tropical moist lowland forests, moist savanna, and intermittent freshwater marshes.
It is threatened by habitat loss.

References

surinamensis
Amphibians of French Guiana
Amphibians of Guyana
Amphibians of Suriname
Amphibians of Trinidad and Tobago
Amphibians of Venezuela
Taxonomy articles created by Polbot
Amphibians described in 1802